Cruel Romance is a 2015 Chinese television series starring Huang Xiaoming and Joe Chen. It is based on the republican  novel The Fate of Jinxiu (锦绣缘) by Yu Yi. The series aired on Hunan TV from 3 March to 26 March 2015.

The series is a commercial success, and became second highest rated television drama for the first half of 2015. It also has over 5 billion views online. Broadcasting rights of the drama were sold to America, Malaysia, Thailand, Hong Kong and Vietnam.

Synopsis
Set in the 1930s, Rong Jinxiu (Joe Chen) was born in a renowned medical family. When her father saves her teacher Mr Chen from a gunshot wound, her entire family was killed by the Japanese. With only a piece of watch as evidence, Jin Xiu heads to Shanghai to search for her enemies. On the ferry there, she meets the famous triad leader Zuo Zhen (Huang Xiaoming) of Shanghai's Huang Pu commerce. Through some entanglement, the watch ends up with Zuo Zhen. In order to retrieve her watch, Jin Xiu heads to Bai Le dance hall to look for him. There, she meets her long-lost half-sister Yin Mingzhu (Lv Jiarong), who is currently a famous dancer and the lover of Shanghai's wealthiest businessman, Xiang Hanchuan (Tse Kwan-ho). However, Ming Zhu still harbours hatred for the Rong family because they abandoned Mingzhu and her sickly mother many years before.

At the dance hall, Jin Xiu gets injured in the midst of a fight between Zuo Zhen and his enemies. Zuo Zhen rescues her and then brings her to Lion Forest hotel, which he had gifted to Xiang Yingdong, the brother of Xiang Hanchuan. While Zuo Zhen finds Jin Xiu annoying, he can't help but find himself attracted towards her and keeps helping her in the shadows, making sure that she is safe and comfortable in Shanghai. Jin Xiu remains clueless and continues to believe that the comfort and safety she has is because of sheer luck.

With all that happening, Mr Maeda, the one behind the murder of Jin Xiu's family, came to Shanghai posed as a businessman from Japan, with plans to execute all the anti-Japanese rebel groups in Shanghai and make Shanghai's business Japan's.

Cast

Main

 Huang Xiaoming as Zuo Zhen
 Also known as Second Master. Leader of the Freedom Fighter triad. Calm, composed and sharp, Zuo Zhen is cold and indifferent to women. However, the appearance of Jinxiu changes that.
 Joe Chen as Rong Jinxiu / Yoko
 Determined, pure and kind-hearted. Jinxiu learnt medicine from her father since young, and is a skilled physician. After her parents' death, she comes to Shanghai alone to find out the truth, gaining independence and wisdom throughout her journey.
 Kimi Qiao as Xiang Yingdong
 Also known as Master Ying. Gentle and humorous, he has sought independence since young, but is overshadowed by his brother. After losing his beloved woman Mingzhu to his brother, he hides his inner pain and struggles by being a playboy. He subsequently falls in love with Jinxiu and comes into conflict with Zuo Zhen.
 Lv Jiarong as Yin Mingzhu
 Jinxiu's half-sister. Because of her mother's death, she is consumed by the desire of revenge and becomes the Japanese's puppet. She loves Yingdong but has no choice but to be with Hanchuan to complete her mission.
 Tse Kwan-ho as Xiang Hanchuan
 CEO of the Xiang Enterprise. A loyal and faithful man. He discovers Zuo Zhen's potential and grooms him into a capable man. Having accidentally snatched his younger brother's lover Mingzhu, he feels deeply apologetic toward him and thus is willing to condone all his wrongdoings.
 Qi Ji as Maeda Ryuichi
 A cold and cruel militarist who would resort to anything for his country. Because of his lowly position, he had no choice but to watch his lover Yang Zi being killed. When he comes to Shanghai and discovers Yang Zi's look-a-like Jinxiu, he resorts to all sorts of methods to win her over.

Supporting

 Zhang Zi as Boss Wang, Hao Wang Dance Hall's boss
 Cai Juntao as Tang Hai
 Zuo Zhen's left-hand man and close friend. He was beaten crippled by Long Si, and later died with Xiaoze Yasha.
 Yang Le as Shi Hao
 Zuo Zhen's right-hand man and close friend. Stays by Long Si's side as a spy to help Zuo Zhen.
 Xie Wenxuan as Jin Ling, Ming Zhu's confidante. She likes Zuo Zhen.
 Mark Du as Muto Oda, Japanese spy, Maeda Ryuichi's teacher
 Hao Zejia as Xiaoze Yasha, Japanese spy
 He Hongshan as Shen Meng, Daughter of Shen Jinrong. Innocent and kind. She loves Xiang Yingdong.
 Yoyiki Una as Xiao Lan, An employee at Hotel Lion Forest, Jinxiu's close friend. She later gets together with Tang Hai.
 Feng Peng as Long Si, Zuo Zhen's rival
 Zhao Zhongwei as Mr Feng, CEO of Huang Pu commerce
 Tong Chenjie as Lin Meihua, CEO of Mei Hua company
 Zhang Jian as Zhao Hui, Zuo Zhen's underling
 Zhang Tianye as Ma Ziliu, Zuo Zhen's underling
 Wei Qing as Anna, a dancer at Hao Wang dance hall and Jinxiu's close friend.
 Yu Jieqi as Songben Cilang, Maeda Ryuichi's underling
 Li Ji as Ling Li, Meihua's younger cousin. He falls at first sight for Jinxiu.
 Mei Nianjia as Liu Yi, son of the Chief Police, Police Staff Sergeant.
 Wang Min as Police Chief
 Xiao Che as Zhou Mu, Zuo Zhen and Meihua's good friend. He helped introduce Jinxiu to Meihua Company.
 Cao Wan as Shen Jinrong, A rich businessman
 Cui Xinqin as Rong Xinru, Jinxiu's mother, Yin Xinping's younger sister
 Li Jianyi as Rong Qingyuan, Jinxiu and Mingzhu's father
 Jin Jia as Chang Sheng, Jinxiu's teacher
 Xu Xing as Yin Xinping, Mingzhu's mother
 Li Yilin as Yun Qiubao, Yingdong's classmate who asks him to retrieve the pocket watch from Jinxiu
 Meng Zhen as Du Ping, Anna's lover
 Xia Zhiliu as Qin Hao
 Liu Shan as Mad Girl
 Zhou Yunshen as Assistant He
 Liu Xiaoxue as Yin Di, Mingzhu's maid
 Zhou Hong as Manager Hu, Hotel Lion Forest's employee

 Li Zigan as person who was bribed by Maeda Ryuichi to lie to Jinxiu that he is her parents' murderer
 Jiang Feng as Pervert, Mingzhu's admirer
 Luo Zhenhuan as Ah Bi, Hotel Lion Forest's employee. Collaborated with Manager Hu to frame Jinxiu.
 Cao Yanyan as Chen Xiangmei, Manager of Mei Hua company. Ordered by Jin Ling to frame Jinxiu.
 Fan Guolun as Uncle Chen
 Liu Wei as Sister Yao, Employee of Mei Hua company, Jinxiu's superior.
 Xiao Yongjia as Ah Tao, Lao Ma's daughter
 Wan Shengli as Lao Ma, Zuo Zhen's underling who becomes addicted to heroin
 Meng Lingchao as Shou Zai
 Zhang Xiangyu as Fang Ting
 Kun Ao as Zhou Qian
 Ji Limin as Mother Xu
 Zhang Jiayou as Wang Qing
 Liang Jingjing as Liu Xiaoxiao
 Shanghai's biggest celebrity. She disguises herself as Mei Hua company's endorser, helping the freedom fighters to carry out their tasks. Maeda Ryuchi drop her from a high building.
 Wang Guojing as Uncle Wang
 Bao Aoma as Fei Dinan
 An Long as Church Priest
 Ya Mi as Bao Luo
 Huang Jinsheng as Landlord Ding
 Wang Jincheng as Ah Gui
 Sheng Kengjie as Ah Min
 Yi Fei as Dancer
 Ling Haiming as Zuo Zhen's father
 Yin Qianru as Zuo Zhen's mother
 Li Min as Head of Labor
 He Feng as Yue Fen
 Xu Jiehao as Secretary Zhong
 Sun Qiusheng as Boss Chang
 Ke Su as Chen Keke

Soundtrack

Ratings 

 Highest ratings are marked in red, lowest ratings are marked in blue

International broadcast

References

External links

Chinese romance television series
Chinese action television series
Chinese period television series
2015 Chinese television series debuts
Television shows based on Chinese novels
2015 Chinese television series endings
Television shows set in China
Mandarin-language television shows
Hunan Television dramas